The Monetary Authority of Singapore (MAS;) is the central bank and financial regulatory authority of Singapore. It administers the various statutes pertaining to money, banking, insurance, securities and the financial sector in general, as well as currency issuance. It was established in 1971 to act as the banker to and as a financial agent of the Government of Singapore.

History

The MAS was founded in 1971 to oversee various monetary functions associated with banking and finance. Before its establishment, monetary functions were performed by government departments and agencies. The acronym for its name resembles mas, the word for 'gold' in Malay, Singapore's national language – although the acronym is pronounced with each of its initial alphabets.

As Singapore progressed, an increasingly complex banking and monetary environment required more dynamic and coherent monetary administration. Therefore, in 1970, the Parliament of Singapore passed the Monetary Authority of Singapore Act leading to the formation of MAS on 1 January 1971. The act gives MAS the authority to regulate all elements of monetary policy, banking, and finance in Singapore.

During the COVID-19 pandemic, MAS brought forward its twice yearly meeting from some time in April to 30 March. The MAS decided to ease the Singapore dollar's appreciation rate to zero percent, as well as adjust the policy band downwards, the first such move since the Global Financial Crisis. This makes it the first time the MAS had taken these two measures together.

	Unlike many central banks around the world, the MAS is not independent from the executive branch of the Singaporean government; chairmen of the MAS were from the same political party of the Government. Previous chairmen were also either the incumbent or former Ministers of Finance, or were former Prime Ministers or Deputy Prime Ministers of Singapore.

List of chairmen

Policy
Since 1981, monetary policy in Singapore is mainly conducted through the management of the exchange rate of the Singapore dollar, in order to promote price stability as a basis for sustainable economic growth. The exchange rate is an intermediate target of monetary policy in the context of the small and open Singapore economy (where gross exports and imports of goods and services are more than 300 percent of GDP and almost 40 cents of every Singapore dollar spent domestically is on imports), the exchange rate represents a significantly stronger influence on inflation than the interest rate. As a result, the nominal exchange rate, directly and indirectly, affects a wide range of prices in the Singapore economy, such as import and export prices, wages and rentals, consumer prices and output prices.

MAS controls monetary policy through direct interventions in the foreign exchange markets and bears a stable and predictable relationship with the price stability as the final target of policy, over the medium-term. The Singapore dollar (SGD) is managed against a basket of currencies of Singapore's major trading partners and competitors; the various currencies are assigned weights in accordance with the importance of the country to Singapore's international trading relations (as shown below) and the composition of the basket is revised periodically to take into account any changes in trade patterns.

MAS operates a managed float regime for the Singapore dollar. The tradeweighted exchange rate, which is known as the 'Singapore dollar Nominal Effective Exchange Rate' (S$ NEER) is allowed to fluctuate within a policy band; the level and direction of which is announced semi-annually (typically every six months) to the market. The policy band provides a mechanism to accommodate short-term fluctuations in the foreign exchange markets and allows flexibility in managing the exchange rate.

The exchange rate policy band is periodically reviewed by MAS to ensure that the policy band remains consistent with underlying fundamentals of the economy; the path of the exchange rate is continually assessed every 6 months in order to prevent a misalignment in the currency value. A Monetary Policy Statement (MPS) is released by MAS after each review, which provides information on the recent movements of the exchange rate and explaining the forward guidance of future exchange rate policy. MAS would also release an accompanying report, the Macroeconomic Review (MR), which provides detailed information on the assessment of macroeconomic developments and trends in the Singapore economy; the MR is aimed to enhance market and public understanding of the monetary policy stance.

As the MAS utilises the choice of the exchange rate as the intermediate target of monetary policy, this implies that MAS does not have any control over domestic interest rates (and money supply), due to the commonly accepted concept in international economics known as the policy trilemma. In the context of free capital movements, interest rates in Singapore are largely determined by foreign interest rates and investor expectations of the future movements in the Singapore dollar. Singapore domestic interest rates have typically been below U.S. Fed funds interest rates and reflect market expectations of a trend appreciation of the Singapore dollar over time.

The exchange rate has emerged as an effective anti-inflation tool for the Singapore economy. In the twenty years since the exchange rate framework was in place, domestic inflation was relatively low, averaging 1.9% per annum from 1981 to 2010. As a result of the long record of low inflation, expectations of price stability in Singapore have become more entrenched over the years.  The exchange rate system has also functioned to mitigate the adverse effects of short-term volatility on the real economy, while at the same time ensuring that the exchange rate remains aligned with economic conditions and fundamentals. The success of the exchange rate system is heavily dependent on the economic fundamentals of Singapore, such as prudent fiscal policy, flexible product and factor markets, sound financial system, and robust domestic corporate sector.

Debt
Singapore's debts are under the responsibility of MAS. As of 2022, Singapore's government debt exceeds the country's GDP at about 150%. However, these are not net debts, but gross external debts, which can be traced to the debt liabilities in Singapore's banking sector – a reflection of the country's stature as a major global financial hub. In essence, Singapore borrows to invest, not to spend. Therefore, unlike other countries, Singapore is a net creditor with no debt to anyone, and has a net debt-to-GDP ratio of 0%, maintained for almost three decades since 1995.

Accordingly, Singapore is the only country in Asia with a AAA sovereign credit rating from all major rating agencies. For multiple years, Singapore emerged as the top country in the world with the least-risky credit rating under the Euromoney Country Risk (ECR) rankings, being one of the safest investment destinations. The country was also ranked as the freest economy in the world on the Index of Economic Freedom rankings.

Major Trading Partners of Singapore

Issuing banknotes and coins 
Following its merger with the Board of Commissioners of Currency on 1 October 2002, the MAS assumed the function of currency issuance.

MAS has the exclusive right to issue banknotes and coins in the Republic of Singapore. Their dimensions, designs and denominations are determined by the Monetary Policy Committee with Government approval. The banknotes and coins thus issued have the status of legal tender within the country for all transactions, both public and private, without limitation.

In December 2020, MAS approved digital bank licenses for 4 tech giants, Grab-Singtel consortium, Ant Group, Sea Group, and Greenland Financial consortium. Grab-Singtel and Sea Group were awarded digital full banking licenses, while Ant Group and Greenland Financial were awarded digital wholesale banking licenses. In May 2021, the ability to transfer money between Singapore's PayNow and Thailand's PromptPay was announced.

Strategic initiatives

ASEAN Financial Innovation Network
ASEAN Financial Innovation Network (AFIN) is a non-profit organization, established by the Monetary Authority of Singapore, ASEAN Bankers Association (ABA) and International Finance Corporation (IFC), a member of the World Bank Group in 2018. AFIN launched the Application Programming Interface Exchange (APIX), a global fintech marketplace and regulatory sandbox in 2018.

Asian Institute of Digital Finance

The Asian Institute of Digital Finance (AIDF) is a research institute to enhance education, research and entrepreneurship in digital finance. AIDF is a collaboration between the Monetary Authority of Singapore, the National Research Foundation and the National University of Singapore (NUS) and was established in 2021.

Singapore FinTech Festival

MAS organises Singapore FinTech Festival (SFF) annually in partnership with The Association of Banks in Singapore and in collaboration with SingEx Holdings, to connect the various FinTech communities around the world to interact with each other.

See also
Securities commission

References

External links

 Monetary Authority of Singapore

Singapore
Statutory boards of the Singapore Government
1971 establishments in Singapore
Government agencies established in 1971
Singaporean companies established in 1971
Banks established in 1971
Regulation in Singapore
Financial regulatory authorities of Singapore